Quartz Lake is located in Glacier National Park, in the U. S. state of Montana. Quartz Lake is a  hike from the Bowman Lake Picnic Area. The historic Quartz Lake Patrol Cabin is on the western shore of Quartz Lake.

See also
List of lakes in Flathead County, Montana (M-Z)

References

Lakes of Glacier National Park (U.S.)
Lakes of Flathead County, Montana